Reinhold Eugen Rau (February 7, 1932 – February 11, 2006) was a German natural historian who initiated the Quagga Project in South Africa, which aims to re-breed the extinct quagga, a sub-species of zebra.

Rau was born in Friedrichsdorf, Germany, and trained as a taxidermist at the Senckenberg Museum in Frankfurt, joining the South African Museum in Cape Town in 1959. Rau was initially part of a team of seven taxidermists working at the museum. Although principally known for his work on quaggas, Rau also rediscovered a species of tortoise which had been thought extinct.
 
Rau continued to work at the South African Museum following his retirement; he died on February 11, 2006, at his home in Cape Town.

Quaggas 
Rau's interest in quaggas began in 1969, when he re-mounted a quagga foal at the South African Museum. In 1971, Rau visited museums across Europe, and ultimately examined 22 of the world's 23 quagga specimens. Dried tissue samples from the skin of the South African Museum's quagga foal, together with additional tissue samples from the two Mainz quaggas that he re-mounted in 1980/81, formed the basis of the DNA analyses that led to the discovery that the Quagga was a subspecies of the Plains Zebra, not a distinct species. This led to Rau founding the Quagga Project, an attempt to re-breed the extinct Quagga.

Rau's quest to rebreed the Quagga is said to have provided inspiration for Michael Crichton's 1990 novel Jurassic Park.

In 2000, the Cape Tercentenary Foundation awarded Rau the Molteno Medal for lifetime services to nature conservation in the Cape.

In 2013, Khumba, an animated movie about a quagga, was dedicated to Rau's memory.

Works

References

1932 births
2006 deaths
Scientists from Hesse
South African naturalists
People from Friedrichsdorf
German emigrants to South Africa
20th-century naturalists